Smilo (previously known as  Smajling Swedes and SMAJL) is a Swedish electronic dance music trio, consisting of Arvid Ångström, Dennis Babic, and Oscar Berglund Juhola.

The group released their debut single "Warfare" in 2014 under the name "SMAJL" but later changed their name to "Smajling Swedes". In 2015, they competed in Svensktoppen nästa with the song "Goosebumps" and were handpicked to compete in Melodifestivalen 2016.

They later changed their name once again to "Smilo" and performed in the third semi-final of Melodifestivalen 2016 with the song "Weight of the World", where they placed fifth and were eliminated from the competition. The song has since peaked at number-57 on Sverigetopplistan.

Members
Arvid Ångström — born  in Örnsköldsvik
Dennis Babic — born  in Vendelsö
Oscar Berglund Juhola — born  in Vendelsö

Discography

Singles

References

Swedish musical trios
Swedish electronic music groups
Swedish dance music groups
Melodifestivalen contestants of 2016